Arnail François, marquis de Jaucourt, comte de l'Empire (14 November 17575 February 1852) was a French aristocrat and politician.

Biography

Military career and Revolution
Jaucourt was born in Tournon (Seine-et-Marne) of a Protestant family, protected by Louis Joseph de Bourbon, prince de Condé, whose Dragoon regiment he entered at the age of fifteen. He became colonel of his regiment, and made himself known for his welcoming of the French Revolution and his affiliation with the Feuillants.

A deputy to the Legislative Assembly in 1791, elected by the départment of Seine-et-Marne, he generally voted with the minority. As his views came to be considered too moderate by his colleagues, he resigned in 1792, and was soon after arrested on suspicion of being a reactionary. Madame de Staël obtained his release from Louis Pierre Manuel just before the September Massacres. He made his way to England, and joined the group who during 1792-93 took refuge at Juniper Hall in Surrey, supported by Madame de Stael, who later joined them. He returned to France after the execution of King Louis XVI.

Consulate and First Empire
Jaucourt took refuge in Switzerland to escape the Reign of Terror, and returned only after Napoleon Bonaparte's 18 Brumaire coup and the establishment of the French Consulate, entering the tribunate, of which he was the president for a short period.

In 1803, Jaucourt entered the French Senate, and next year, upon the establishment of the First Empire, he became attached to the household of Joseph Bonaparte. He accompanied Joseph to the Kingdom of Naples, and was created a count of the Empire by Napoleon.

Restoration, July Monarchy, and later years
During the following years, Jaucourt distanced himself from the imperial cause, and, with the Bourbon Restoration he became Minister of State and a Peer of France. After the outcome of the Hundred Days (during which he stood by Louis XVIII), he was Naval Minister in July–September 1815, but held no further office. He devoted himself to the support of the Protestant interest in France, and tried to reduce the effects of the White Terror.

A member of the upper house after the July Revolution and throughout the reign of Louis Philippe (the July Monarchy), he was driven into private life by the establishment of the Second Republic, but lived to see the 1851 coup and to rally to the government of Louis-Napoléon Bonaparte, dying in Paris the next year.

References

External links
 Bio and portrait at the Musée Virtuel du Protestantisme Français

1757 births
1852 deaths
People from Seine-et-Marne
Marquesses of Jaucourt
Counts of the First French Empire
French Protestants
Politicians from Île-de-France
Ministers of Marine and the Colonies
State ministers of France
Members of the Legislative Assembly (France)
Members of the Sénat conservateur
Members of the Chamber of Peers of the Bourbon Restoration
Members of the Chamber of Peers of the July Monarchy
French diplomats
Coppet group
People of the French Revolution
Burials at Père Lachaise Cemetery